Homadaula punctigera is a moth in the family Galacticidae. It was described by Rebel in 1910. It is found in the Alai Mountains in Central Asia.

The wingspan is about 16 mm. Adults are dark greyish, with black scales. The hindwings are dark grey.

References

Moths described in 1910
Galacticidae